The Shore is a 1983 Soviet-German romance film directed by Aleksandr Alov and Vladimir Naumov.

Plot 
Russian writer Vadim Nikitin, who goes to Hamburg and recalls the final battles of the Great Patriotic War and a young German woman named Emma, with whom he was in love. And suddenly, forty years later, he met her again.

Cast 
 Boris Shcherbakov as Vadim Nikitin
 Natalya Belokhvostikova as Emma Herbert
 Bernhard Wicki as Weber, Verleger
 Vladimir Gostyukhin as Mesenin
 Valery Storozhik as Knyazhko
 Mikhail Golubovich as Granaturov
 Vladimir Zamansky as Zykin
 Andrey Gusev as Uschatikov
 Armen Dzhigarkhanyan as Platon Petrovich
 Bruno Dietrich as  Mr. Dietzman

Awards
1984 —  17th All-Union Film Festival (Kiev):  Grand Prix
1985 — USSR State Prize

References

External links 
 

1983 films
1980s Russian-language films
Soviet romantic drama films
Films directed by Aleksandr Alov
Films directed by Vladimir Naumov
Mosfilm films
Films based on Russian novels
West German films
1983 romantic drama films
German romantic drama films
1980s German films